The 1886 Dartmouth football team represented Dartmouth College in the 1886 college football season. Dartmouth compiled a record of 2–2.

Schedule

References

Dartmouth
Dartmouth Big Green football seasons
Dartmouth football